Robert V. Young, Jr. (born 1947) is a professor of Renaissance Literature and Literary Criticism in the English Department of North Carolina State University, co-founder and co-editor (with M. Thomas Hester) of the John Donne Journal, and author of multiple books and articles primarily related to the study of literature. He became the editor of the conservative quarterly Modern Age in 2007.

He has served as director of graduate studies in the English Department at NCSU, as well as continuing to teach multiple courses in the department, especially regarding Renaissance and medieval literature. His articles on English literature and education have appeared in multiple journals and periodicals, including the John Donne Journal, Ben Jonson Journal, First Things, The Weekly Standard, National Review, and Culture Wars. He is also a member of and has served as president (1998–1999) of the John Donne Society, receiving its 2002 Award for Distinguished Publication in Donne Studies for his book Doctrine and Devotion in Seventeenth-Century Poetry. He is a senior editor of Touchstone magazine.

His published essays and public lectures cover a wide variety of moral and religious topics as well as Renaissance, Medieval and twentieth-century literary theory and criticism. He is particularly well known for his writing on the works of 17th century English poets John Donne, Richard Crashaw, Henry Vaughan, and George Herbert.

Dr. Young received his B.A. in English from Rollins College and his M.Phil. and Ph.D. from Yale University.  He is also a fluent reader and translator of Latin, as well as a convert to the Roman Catholic faith.

Books

Author
At War with the Word: Literary Theory and Liberal Education (Intercollegiate Studies Institute, 1999)
Doctrine & Devotion in Seventeenth-Century Poetry:  Studies in Donne, Herbert, Crashaw, and Vaughan (Boydell & Brewer, 2000)
Richard Crashaw and the Spanish Golden Age (Yale studies in English) (Yale University Press, 1982)
A Student's Guide to Literature (Intercollegiate Studies Institute, 2000)

Translator
Principles of Letter-Writing: A Bilingual Text of Justi Lipsii Epistolica Institutio (Southern Illinois University Press, 1996)

External links
The John Donne Journal
John Donne Society
His writings in Touchstone magazine

Articles
"The Bard, the Black, the Jew" in First Things 141 (March 2004): 22-29
"Before Foucault", a book review in First Things 72 (April 1997): 50-52
"Dante's New Guide", book review in Touchstone Magazine
"The Gay Invention", a feature article in Touchstone Magazine (December 2005)
Book review of Henry Howard the Poet Earl of Surrey: A Life in the South Atlantic Review
"Herbert and the Real Presence" in Renascence, Spring '93, Vol. 45, Issue 3
"John Donne, Richard Crashaw, and the Mystery of God's Grace", in Catholic Dossier (March/April 2002)
"Nature and Grace in the Character of Western Man", from Christianity and Western Civilization. Christopher Dawson’s Insight: Can a Culture Survive the Loss of Its Religious Roots?, papers Presented at a Conference Sponsored by the Wethersfield Institute New York City, October 15, 1993 (San Francisco: Ignatius Press, 1993): 37–56.
"The Old New Criticism and its Critics" in First Things 35 (August/September 1993): 38-44
"The Universities and the Transmission of Culture", a speech given at the Cleveland Regional Meeting of The Philadelphia Society (Sept. 21, 2002)

American literary critics
American non-fiction writers
Literary critics of English
North Carolina State University faculty
Living people
Rollins College alumni
Yale University alumni
1947 births